The news agency Lenta PMR was a non-governmental, nationwide online news service disseminating news from Transnistria, Moldova and abroad.

History 

Lenta PMR was founded in July 2004 by Russian strategist and publicist Roman Konoplev. The agency published news and analysis of social-political, economic, scientific and financial subjects on the Internet and via e-mail. The main purpose of the project was to analyse the situation in Moldova and Transnistria (also known as Pridnestrovie).

The last editor-in-chief of Lenta PMR was a Transnistrian politician Dmitry Soin.

After the presidential elections of 2011 in Transnistria the agency Lenta PMR has become known as an opposition-leaning.

In December 2012 news agency was banned in Transnistria.

References

External links 

  
 “A Quarrel In A Far-Away Country”: The Rise Of A Budzhak People’s Republic?

Moldovan news websites
News agencies based in Moldova
Mass media in Transnistria